The 2003 East Hampshire District Council election took place on 1 May 2003 to elect members of East Hampshire District Council in Hampshire England. The whole council was up for election with boundary changes since the last election in 1999 increasing the number of seats by 2. The Conservative party stayed in overall control of the council.

Election result

3 Conservative and 1 Liberal Democrat candidates were unopposed at the election.

Ward results

Alton Amery

Alton Ashdell

Alton Eastbrooke

Alton Westbrooke

Alton Whitedown

Alton Wooteys

Binstead and Bentley

Bramshott and Liphook

Bramshott and Liphook

Downland

East Meon

Four Marks and Medstead

Froxfield and Steep

Grayshott

Headley

Holybourne

Horndean Catherington & Lovedean

Horndean Downs

Horndean Hazleton & Blendworth

Hordean Kings

Horndean Murray

Lindford

Liss

Petersfield Bell Hill

Petersfield Causeway

Petersfield Heath

Petersfield Rother

Petersfield St. Mary's

Petersfield St. Peter's

Rowlands Castle

Ropley and Tisted

Selborne

The Hangers and Forest

Whitehill Chase

Whitehill Deadwater

Whitehill Hogmoor

Whitehill Pinewood

Whitehill Walldown

References

2003
2003 English local elections
2000s in Hampshire